P'iqi Q'ara (Aymara p'iqi, p'iq'iña, phiq'i, phiq'iña head, q'ara bald, bare, "bald-headed", also spelled Pekhe Khara) is a   mountain in the Andes of Bolivia. It is located in the La Paz Department, Nor Yungas Province,  Coroico Municipality.

References 

Mountains of La Paz Department (Bolivia)